Howard H. Railey (died December 19, 1936) was an American politician from West Virginia. A Republican, he represented Fayette County, West Virginia in 1904 in the West Virginia House of Representatives. He served as superintendent of the West Virginia Colored Orphans Home. He died at his home in Institute, West Virginia.

He received a diploma in 1900.

See also
List of African-American officeholders (1900–1959)

References

Year of birth missing
Date of birth missing
Place of birth missing
1936 deaths
Republican Party members of the West Virginia House of Delegates
People from Institute, West Virginia
African-American men in politics
People from Fayette County, West Virginia
African-American people in West Virginia politics
20th-century American politicians
20th-century African-American politicians